The Cate House, at 111 N. Magnolia St. in Hammond, Louisiana, was built around 1900.  It was listed on the National Register of Historic Places in 1998.

It is a -story frame house which is mainly Queen Anne in style but also includes elements of Colonial Revival.  It was under renovation in 1998.

References

National Register of Historic Places in Tangipahoa Parish, Louisiana
Queen Anne architecture in Louisiana
Colonial Revival architecture in Louisiana
Houses completed in 1900